This is a list of historical online magazines.

See also
 Magazine
 Wikipedia:List of online newspaper archives
 List of online image archives

Online magazines